Food: Fact or Fiction? is an American food-themed television series that airs on Cooking Channel. It is presented by actor Michael McKean. The series features McKean discussing the history of different foods and then breaking down whether common beliefs about the history of those foods are indeed factual.

Food: Fact or Fiction? officially premiered on October 26, 2015.

Episodes

Season 1

Season 2

Season 3

Season 4

Notes

References

External links
 
 
 Revelations Entertainment

2015 American television series debuts
Cooking Channel original programming
English-language television shows
Food reality television series
Television series by Revelations Entertainment